German submarine U-607 was a Type VIIC U-boat built for the Nazi Germany's Kriegsmarine for service during the Second World War. She was commissioned on 29 January 1942 and was sunk on 13 July 1943, having sunk four ships and damaged two others. Her commanders were Ernst Mengersen and Wolf Jeschonnek.

Description
U-607 was built by Blohm & Voss, Hamburg as yard number 583. She was ordered on 22 May 1940 and her keel was laid on 27 March 1941. U-607 was launched on 11 December 1941. She displaced  surfaced and  submerged.

Design
German Type VIIC submarines were preceded by the shorter Type VIIB submarines. U-607 had a displacement of  when at the surface and  while submerged. She had two shafts and two  propellers.

U-607 was fitted with five  torpedo tubes (four fitted at the bow and one at the stern), fourteen torpedoes, one  SK C/35 naval gun, 220 rounds, and a  C/30 anti-aircraft gun. The boat had a complement of between forty-four and sixty.

Service history

Under Mengersen
U-607 was commissioned  into the Kriegsmarine on 29 January, and entered 5th U-boat Flotilla based at Kiel under the command of Ernst Mengersen as a boat under training. In August 1942, U-607 completed her training and transferred to 7th U-boat Flotilla based at St Nazaire, France as an operational boat.

First patrol
On 13 July, U-607 departed Kristiansand on active patrol. During the patrol she sank one ship and damaged another, breaking off the attack after depth charges were dropped. She returned to Kristiansand on 16 August. U-607 then sailed to St Nazaire.

Second patrol
On 8 September, U-607 departed St Nazaire on active patrol, returning on 23 October. During the patrol she sank one ship. On 23 September, U-607 was rammed by a destroyer and slightly damaged. U-607 suffered heavy damage when she attacked Convoy SC 104 On 11 October. The boat descended to a depth of  before she could be brought under control. The badly damaged boat was brought to the surface, evading detection as it was night. U-607 had suffered damage to her communication systems, depth gauges, depth rudder, engines and rudder. It took some time to make temporary repairs. Leutnant (Ing.) (Engineering Lieutenant) Russ openly quarrelled with Mengersen over the incident, which was witnessed by some of the ship's crew and a propaganda photographer who was on board. On returning to St Nazaire, Russ was court-Martialled and found guilty of insubordination. He was dismissed from the Kriegsmarine and sentenced to eight months fortress confinement and four months imprisonment. U-607 took six weeks to repair at St Nazaire.

Third Patrol
On 2 January 1943, U-607 departed St Nazaire on active patrol, returning on 9 March. During the patrol she sank one ship and damaged another.

Under Jeschonnek

Fourth patrol
On 24 April 1943, U-607 departed St Nazaire on active patrol under the command of Oberleutnant zur See Wolf Jeschonnek. Jeschonnek had served on U-607 since her commissioning. During the patrol she was attacked on a number of occasions. On 28 April she was attacked by a Vickers Wellington aircraft of 172 Squadron, Royal Air Force. On 12 May she was attacked by a Fairey Swordfish of 811 Squadron, Fleet Air Arm. After this, she was hunted by a Royal Navy corvette which opened fire at extreme range without effect. She was forced to submerge when one of her diesel engines broke down. Over a seven-hour period a number of depth charges were dropped without effect. U-607 managed to surface a couple of times and was forced to dive again. The third time she surfaced there was an area of mist and she was able to make her escape.

Jeschennek claimed that Irish Oak was a Q-ship, steaming at  without lights. Irish Oak had large Tricolours painted on her sides with the word EIRE in large letters. Two torpedoes were fired and the ship slowly sank by the bow. Around 60 crew were seen to leave the ship. U-607 returned to St Nazaire on 2 June. During her time in St Nazaire after this patrol, extra anti-aircraft armament was fitted.

Fifth patrol and loss
On 10 July 1943, U-607 departed St Nazaire on active patrol. Her orders were to lay mines off Kingston, Jamaica, with explicit orders not to attack any convoys encountered. U-607 was to proceed in convoy with three other U-boats, although one of these put back to St Nazaire with defects. The submarines were submerged at night and sailed on the surface during daytime. Just after midnight on 13 July, a bottle of Champagne was opened to toast Jeschonnek's birthday. U-607 surfaced at about 07:55 German time  and was spotted by Sunderland, DQ-N, of 228 Squadron, Royal Air Force and then by Halifax, BY-O, of 58 Squadron, Royal Air Force.

Wishing to present as small a target as possible, U-607 turned away from the Halifax. This meant that she was becoming increasingly further from the other two U-boats. The three U-boats opened fire on the aircraft. The aircraft successfully managed to split the fire of the U-boats, which ceased firing after a while.

The depth charges straddled U-607 from port quarter to starboard bow. Their detonation broke her in two, with the bow section rising over vertical and sinking while the stern section capsized then sank. Twenty-five survivors were seen in the water and the Sunderland dropped a dinghy. Seven of the crew managed to climb aboard. Only these seven of the 51 crew survived. Although ships of the Second Support Group passed close by, the survivors were not picked up as no ship could be spared for the task. A flight of Junkers Ju 88 aircraft flew over at an altitude to  apparently without spotting the survivors. The survivors were asked the number of their boat, which at first they refused to divulge. When told that they would not be rescued without divulging this information, Oberleutnant zur See Jeschonnek called the boat back and gave the information required.

Wolfpacks
U-607 took part in twelve wolfpacks, namely:
 Wolf (25 – 30 July 1942) 
 Pirat (30 July – 3 August 1942) 
 Steinbrinck (3 – 10 August 1942) 
 Pfeil (12 – 22 September 1942) 
 Blitz (22 – 26 September 1942) 
 Tiger (26 – 30 September 1942) 
 Wotan (5 – 16 October 1942) 
 Falke (8 – 19 January 1943) 
 Haudegen (19 January – 15 February 1943) 
 Drossel (29 April – 15 May 1943) 
 Oder (17 – 19 May 1943) 
 Mosel (19 – 23 May 1943)

Summary of raiding history

References

Bibliography

External links

Ships built in Hamburg
German Type VIIC submarines
U-boats commissioned in 1942
U-boats sunk in 1943
World War II submarines of Germany
World War II shipwrecks in the Atlantic Ocean
1941 ships
U-boats sunk by depth charges
U-boats sunk by British aircraft
Maritime incidents in July 1943